The World Trade Center Turku is a world trade center for financial companies and bureaus, located in central Turku, Finland. The building is located on Linnankatu. the WTC Turku is located within a walking distance to the Port of Turku. In 2018 WTC Turku will relocate to Kupittaa, in premises of Turku Science Park.

See also 
 World Trade Center Helsinki

External links
 Official site

Buildings and structures in Turku
Turku